The sixth and final season of Cougar Town, an American sitcom that aired on TBS, began airing on January 6, 2015, and concluded on March 31, 2015. Season six regular cast members include Courteney Cox, Christa Miller, Busy Philipps, Dan Byrd, Ian Gomez, and Josh Hopkins. The sitcom was created by Bill Lawrence and Kevin Biegel.

Production
The show was renewed for a sixth and final season on May 10, 2014, containing 13 episodes, which began airing on January 6, 2015. Production on the final season finished on December 14, 2014. Brian Van Holt, who portrays Bobby Cobb, was announced to be exiting the series at the beginning of the season. Busy Philipps announced to have directed the fifth episode, making her the fourth cast member to have directed an episode, after Courteney Cox, Brian Van Holt and Josh Hopkins.

Casting
It was announced on October 22, 2014, that the Australian pop star Cody Simpson is going to guest-star on the show, as a high school student who has a strong resemblance to Grayson. Cindy Crawford also had a cameo appearance as herself in the season's tenth episode.

Episodes

Ratings

References

General references 
 
 

2015 American television seasons
Cougar Town seasons